The Royal Family Order of Olav V of Norway is a decoration awarded to female members of the Norwegian royal family. It was established in 1958 and has not been awarded since the death of King Olav V.

The ribbon of the Order was red, bordered white with a blue fimbriation along the white border.

List of recipients
Princess Astrid, Mrs. Ferner
Princess Ragnhild, Mrs. Lorentzen 
Princess Märtha Louise of Norway
Queen Sonja of Norway

See also
 Orders, decorations, and medals of Norway

Bibliography
Tom Bergroth: «Royal Portrait Badges», i Guy Stair Sainty og Rafal Heydel-Mankoo: World Orders of Knighthood and Merit, første bind, Buckingham: Burke's Peerage, 2006, p. 829
Dag T. Hoelseth: «The Norwegian Royal House Orders», i Guy Stair Sainty og Rafal Heydel-Mankoo: World Orders of Knighthood and Merit, første bind, Buckingham: Burke's Peerage, 2006, p. 815
Lars Stevnsborg: Kongeriget Danmarks ordener, medaljer og hederstegn. Kongeriget Islands ordener og medaljer, Syddansk Universitetsforlag, 2005, p. 199–212

References

Orders, decorations, and medals of Norway
Awards established in 1958
1958 establishments in Norway
Norwegian monarchy